Saint Nicarete (? 5th century), was a woman of Nicomedia who became a saint as a disciple of St. John Chrysostom.  She left her home specifically to study theology and practice devotion and care for the poor in Constantinople.  She became a follower of John Chrysostom and worked as a physician as well as a healer for the poor.  She cured John Chrysostom of a stomach ailment.  Later, when Chrysostom was sent into exile from Constantinople, she went with him.

Her feast day in the west is December 27.

References
Englebert, Omer.  The Lives of the Saints.  Christopher and Anne Fremantle, trans.  New York: Barnes & Noble, 1994.  Nihil obstat 1951. p. 491.
Catholic Online Accessed Dec. 26, 2006.

External links
 http://www.santiebeati.it/dettaglio/94059

Year of birth missing
Year of death missing
Saints from Roman Anatolia
Saints from Constantinople
5th-century Christian saints